Furling may refer to:
Furling (Stargate), characters in the series Stargate SG-1
Furl (sailing), to gather a sail
Furling (aerodynamics), to manipulating an airfoil
The Furlings, characters in the 1993 film Once Upon a Forest

See also